Homer Hailey (August 12, 1903 – November 9, 2000) was an American preacher in the churches of Christ in the 20th century, a professor at Abilene Christian University and Florida College, and the author of at least fifteen theological books. He was well known for his general biblical knowledge, especially the Old Testament.

Hailey and the churches of Christ are the topics of the book The Churches of Christ in the 20th Century: Homer Hailey's Personal Journey of Faith by David Edwin Harrell, Jr. Most of Hailey's books are still in print. Audio recordings of his sermons and classes are available through TruthOnDisc.Net

Homer Hailey was born outside Marshall in Harrison County in East Texas, the oldest child of Robert Thomas Hailey and the former Mamie Collins. His brothers and sisters were Rob, Ruth, Jack, Roy, and Mary Ida. On December 20, 1930, in Abilene, Texas, he married the former Lois Estelle Manly (1907-1954). They had five children: Roma Luceil, Mary Lois, Homer Rob, Charles Dennis, and Carol Ann. After Lois' death, he married the former Widna Neeley Kirby (1917-1997) on October 4, 1955. Hailey died in 2000 at the age of ninety-seven in Tucson, Arizona.

In 2000, Harrell, a professor emeritus of religion at Auburn University in Auburn, Alabama, published The Churches of Christ in the Twentieth Century: Homer Hailey’s Personal Journey of Faith (University of Alabama Press, 2000).  Harrell alternates chapters between an historical look at an issue or conflict within the first century of the Churches of Christ and the way in which Homer Hailey responded to that issue or conflict. The plain-spoken Hailey who had memorized nearly every verse in the Bible became Harrell's touchstone for the history of the churches of Christ in the 20th century.

In 2001, Alvin Jennings, owner of Star Bible Publications and a student in Homer Hailey's 'Denominational Doctrines' class in 1949, preserved Hailey's polemic style class notes which gave his reasons that led him out of the churches which offer instrumental music. Hailey reviewed the old hectograph outlines and refined them for publication.

As a child, Homer Hailey lived outside Marshall, Texas.  The night Lady Bird Taylor - the future First Lady - was born, her brothers spent the night at the Hailey house, with their friends Homer and Rob.

Bibliography 
 Attitudes And Consequences in the Restoration Movement: Our Heritage From The Pioneers 
 Carrying out the Great Commission - According to the New Testament Pattern  published by Religious Supply Inc. (142 pgs.)	
 Commentary on Daniel: A Prophetic Message, A 
 Commentary on Isaiah: With Emphasis on the Messianic Hope, A Commentary on Job: Now Mine Eye Seeth Thee, A Commentary on the Minor Prophets, A From Creation to the Day of Eternity: God's Great Plan for Man's Redemption God's Judgments and Punishments: Individuals and Nations Hailey's Comments. Volumes One and Two Internal Evidences of Christianity: Outline Studies Let's Go Fishing For Men Messiah of Prophecy to The Messiah on the Throne, The Minor Prophets-spokesmen of God: A Study Workbook for Teachers and Students, The with Robert Harkrider 	
 Mormonism Notes on Mormonism Prayer and Providence Revelation: An Introduction and Commentary That You May Believe: Studies in the Gospel of John  

 The Divorced & Remarried Who Would Come To God (Nevada Publications, 1991, 75 pages)
 The Edomites: The Symbol of the World (Religious Supply, Inc., 1998, 117 pages)
 Mechanical Instruments of Music In Worship Today: Detailed Outline of 1949 Class at Abilene Christian University (Star Bible Publications, 2001, 31 pages)

Sources
  David Edwin Harrell Jr., The Churches of Christ in the Twentieth Century: Homer Hailey’s Personal Journey of Faith'', University of Alabama Press, January 11, 2000, 352 pages, 

1903 births
2000 deaths
American clergy
Abilene Christian University faculty
Hailey, Homer
American members of the Churches of Christ
People from Marshall, Texas
People from Abilene, Texas
People from Temple Terrace, Florida
Annihilationists
American religious writers
American male non-fiction writers
20th-century American non-fiction writers
20th-century American male writers
Religious leaders from Texas
Writers from Texas
20th-century American clergy